Hope is the sixth studio album by Scottish singer Susan Boyle. It was released on 21 October 2014 in North America by Syco Music and Columbia Records. The album contains renditions of classic ballads and uptempo songs themed around inspiration and hope as Boyle sees those as the "two elements we all need in our life to drive us forward and inspire us to go out and capture our dreams; they worked for me after all." Boyle furthermore said of the album, "I have really enjoyed making this album. I had a huge input in music suggestions and finally have been able to record one of my all time favourites, "Angel," originally by Sarah Mclachlan. I also am pleased to be able to sing some uptempo songs that show variation in my repertoire."

The album debuted at number 16 on the Billboard 200 in the United States, becoming Susan Boyle's sixth consecutive top 20 album there.  The album spent 35 weeks at No. 1 on the Billboard Top Inspirational Albums chart.  It has sold 115,000 copies in the United States as of November 2016.

Track listing

Notes
 signifies an additional producer

Charts and certifications

Charts

Certifications

Release history

References

Susan Boyle albums
2013 albums
Syco Music albums
Columbia Records albums